Munarivippu is a 1993 Indian Tamil-language action thriller film directed by Bhuvan in his debut. The film stars Sarathkumar and Heera, while Napoleon, Chinni Jayanth and S. S. Chandran play supporting roles. It was released on 18 June 1993.

Plot

Cast 
Sarathkumar as Gopi
Heera as Padma
Napoleon as Ranjith
Chinni Jayanth

Production 
R. S. Bhuvan who assisted R. K. Selvamani made his directorial debut with this film.

Music 
The music was composed by Deva and lyrics written by Vaali.

Reception 
The Indian Express wrote that director "could have done a better job on his screenplay and treatment and avoided the jerky narration and hotch-potch of situations".

References

External links 
 

1990s Tamil-language films
1993 action thriller films
1993 directorial debut films
1993 films
Films scored by Deva (composer)
Indian action thriller films